Miss Asia Pacific International 2018 was the third edition of Miss Asia Pacific International after its 2016 re-launch.

The pageant was held at the Newport Performing Arts Theater, in Manila, Philippines on October 4, 2018, with fifty-one women from around the world, competing for the crown.

Former winner, Francielly Ouriques of Brazil crowned Sharifa Akeel of the Philippines as the pageant winner.

Results 

∆ People's Choice Winner

Order of Announcements

Top 20

Top 10

Top 5

Pre-Pageant

The following are pre-pageant awards.

Special Awards I

Special Awards II

Candidates
Candidates from 51 countries competed:

Notes

See also
 List of beauty contests
 Miss Asia Pacific International

References

External links
Official website

2018 beauty pageants
2017